Meetings with a Young Poet is a Canadian film that premiered at the 2013 International Film Festival of India. It was directed by Rudy Barichello and stars Stephen McHattie, Vincent Hoss-Desmarais and Maria de Medeiros.

The film explores the life and works of Irish playwright, poet and author Samuel Beckett, through his discussions with a depressed young poet from Montreal, Quebec.

References

External links
Meetings With a Young Poet on Facebook

2013 films
Canadian drama films
Samuel Beckett
Films about Nobel laureates
Films about writers
English-language Canadian films
2010s Canadian films